Clay City may refer to the following places in the United States:

Clay City, Illinois, a village
Clay City Township, Clay County, Illinois
Clay City, Indiana, a town
Clay City, Spencer County, Indiana, an unincorporated community
Clay City, Kentucky, a home rule-class city